Baudricourt is a commune in the Vosges department in Grand Est in northeastern France.

Baudricourt is on the Cochon river, a left tributary of the Val d'Arol.

History
The name Baldrici curtis is attested as early as the 10th century. The erection of the marquisate of Baudricourt in 1719 had the effect of changing the name of the village which was called Saint-Menge until 1766.

In July 1767 letters patent of Louis XV allowed that the name of Bassompierre be attributed to the seigniory of Baudricourt. Finally, (after the French Revolution the municipality takes again its current name in 1790.

Baudricourt belonged to the bailliage of Mirecourt. Its church, dedicated to Saint Remi, was in from the diocese of Toul, deanery of Porsas. The cure was at the collation of the chapter of Remiremont et au concours.

Baudricourt belonged to the canton of Rouvres-en-Xaintois from 1793 to 1801, then to the canton of Vittel until 1806, and finally, to that of Mirecourt as today.

Population

Heraldry
A Coat of Arms with gold on a lion creeping with sand, armed, and crowned Gules.
This is the coat of arms of the lords of Baudricourt. When the old barony was erected as a marquisate in 1719, it took the name and arms (three chevrons Gules on field of silver) of the Bassompierre. Today, the commune has taken over the arms of its former lords

Notable people

 Robert de Baudricourt, captain of Vaucouleurs and character of the epic of Joan of Arc 
 Jean de Baudricourt, Marshal of France at the end of the 15th century.

See also
Communes of the Vosges department

References

Communes of Vosges (department)